Leroy "Roy" Lewis Proebstel (10 April 1893 – 3 March 1963) was a New Zealand professional rugby league footballer who played in the 1910s.

Early years
Proebstel was born in the American state of Washington and moved to New Zealand when he was seven.

Playing career
Proebstel represented New Zealand on the 1913 tour of Australia.

Legacy

References

1893 births
1963 deaths
People from Okanogan County, Washington
American emigrants to New Zealand
New Zealand national rugby league team players
New Zealand rugby league players
Rugby league wingers
Wellington rugby league team players
Petone Panthers players